Rostyslav Voloshynovych (born 23 May 1991) is a Ukrainian football midfielder who plays for Prykarpattia Ivano-Frankivsk.

Career
Voloshynovych is a product of his native FC Karpaty Broshniv-Osada sportive school.

He spent his career as player in the amateur level and in July 2014 signed a contract with the Ukrainian First League team FC Ternopil and subsequently with another team from Ternopil – Nyva.

References

External links
 
 

1991 births
Living people
Ukrainian footballers
Association football midfielders
FC Ternopil players
FC Nyva Ternopil players
Ukrainian Premier League players
NK Veres Rivne players
FC Lviv players
FC Volyn Lutsk players
FC Prykarpattia Ivano-Frankivsk (1998) players
Ukrainian First League players
Ukrainian Second League players
Sportspeople from Ivano-Frankivsk Oblast